Albese con Cassano is a town and comune in the province of Como, Lombardy, Italy.

Cities and towns in Lombardy